The Barbuda warbler (Setophaga subita) is a species of bird in the family Parulidae. It is endemic to the island of Barbuda in Antigua and Barbuda. Its natural habitat is tropical dry shrubland near wetland areas. It is threatened by habitat loss.  It once was considered a subspecies of the Adelaide's warbler. In September 2017, the warbler's habitat was massively damaged by Hurricane Irma. Despite this, the species was found to have survived the storm and its aftermath, and later surveys have indicated that the species was not significantly affected by the hurricane. However, it is still threatened by unplanned housing development, garbage dumping, and poor land-use practices.

Description 
The Barbuda warbler is 12–13.5 cm long and weighs 5-8 grams. It is yellow below with gray upperparts, and a gray eyering.

References

 Raffaele, Herbert; James Wiley, Orlando Garrido, Allan Keith & Janis Raffaele (2003) Birds of the West Indies, Christopher Helm, London.

 https://www.hbw.com/species/barbuda-warbler-setophaga-subita

Barbuda Warbler
Animals of Barbuda
Endemic birds of Antigua and Barbuda
Barbuda warbler
Barbuda warbler
Taxonomy articles created by Polbot